Léchelle is the name of two communes in France:

 Léchelle, Pas-de-Calais
 Léchelle, Seine-et-Marne

See also
 Léchelles, a municipality in Switzerland